Belgium participated in the Eurovision Song Contest 2021 with the song "The Wrong Place" written by Alex Callier and Charlotte Foret. The song was performed by the band Hooverphonic, which was internally selected by the Belgian broadcasters Vlaamse Radio- en Televisieomroeporganisatie (VRT) and Radio Télévision Belge de la Communauté Française (RTBF) in March 2020 to represent the nation at the 2021 contest in Rotterdam, Netherlands, after they were due to compete in the 2020 contest with "Release Me" before the 2020 event's cancellation. The song, "The Wrong Place", was presented to the public on 4 March 2021.

Belgium was drawn to compete in the first semi-final of the Eurovision Song Contest which took place on 18 May 2021. Performing during the show in position 11, "The Wrong Place" was announced among the top 10 entries of the first semi-final and therefore qualified to compete in the final on 22 May. It was later revealed that Belgium placed ninth out of the 16 participating countries in the semi-final with 117 points. In the final, Belgium performed in position 4 and placed nineteenth out of the 26 participating countries, scoring 74 points.

Background

In 2019, Eliot represented the country with the song "Wake Up", placing thirteenth in the first semi-final and failing to advance to the final.

The Belgian broadcasters for the 2021 contest, which broadcast the event in Belgium and organises the selection process for its entry, were Vlaamse Radio- en Televisieomroeporganisatie (VRT) and Radio Télévision Belge de la Communauté Française (RTBF). The Belgian participation in the contest traditionally alternates between two broadcasters: the Flemish VRT and the Walloon RTBF, however, their 2021 participation was a collaboration between both broadcasters due to the cancellation of the 2020 contest. Both broadcasters have selected the Belgian entry using national finals and internal selections in the past. In 2018 and 2019, both VRT and RTBF internally selected the Belgian entry. On 20 March 2020, VRT and RTBF confirmed Belgium's participation in the 2021 Eurovision Song Contest and continued the internal selection procedure.

Before Eurovision

Internal selection 
The Belgian entry for the 2021 Eurovision Song Contest was selected via an internal selection by both VRT and RTBF. On 20 March 2020, both broadcasters confirmed that the band Hooverphonic would remain as Belgium's representative for the contest. On 9 November 2020, it was announced that Geike Arnaert would return as the lead singer of the band, replacing Luka Cruysberghs; Arnaert had previously been the lead singer between 1997 and 2008, while Cruysberghs acted in such a role since 2018. 

The song Hooverphonic would perform at the contest, "The Wrong Place", was presented to the public on 4 March 2021 during the radio MNM programme De Grote Peter Van de Veire Ochtendshow. The song was written by member of the band, Alex Callier, along with Charlotte Foret, and was selected from two songs shortlisted among 25 that were in the running in December 2020. The music video for the song, directed by Jan Boon, was released on the same day of the presentation.

At Eurovision 

According to Eurovision rules, all nations with the exceptions of the host country and the "Big Five" (France, Germany, Italy, Spain and the United Kingdom) are required to qualify from one of two semi-finals in order to compete for the final; the top ten countries from each semi-final progress to the final. The European Broadcasting Union (EBU) split up the competing countries into six different pots based on voting patterns from previous contests, with countries with favourable voting histories put into the same pot. The semi-final allocation draw held for the Eurovision Song Contest 2020 on 28 January 2020 was used for the 2021 contest, which Belgium was placed into the first semi-final, which was held on 18 May 2021, and was scheduled to perform in the second half of the show.

Once all the competing songs for the 2021 contest had been released, the running order for the semi-finals was decided by the shows' producers rather than through another draw, so that similar songs were not placed next to each other. Belgium was set to perform in position 11, following the entry from Croatia and preceding the entry from Israel.

The two semi-finals and the final was broadcast in Belgium by both the Flemish and Walloon broadcasters. VRT broadcast the shows on één and Ketnet with commentary in Dutch by Peter Van de Veire. RTBF televised the shows on La Une with commentary in French by Jean-Louis Lahaye and Fanny Jandrain; the second semi-final aired on a 90-minute delay on La Une. Jandrain replaced Maureen Louys as a commentator after she was absent due to testing positive for COVID-19. The first semi-final and the final was also broadcast by RTBF on VivaCité with commentary in French by Lahaye and Jandrain, while VRT also broadcast the final on Radio 2 with commentary in Dutch by Anja Daems and Showbizz Bart. The Belgian spokesperson, who announced the top 12-point score awarded by the Belgian jury during the final, was Danira Boukhriss.

Semi-final 

Hooverphonic took part in technical rehearsals on 9 and 12 May, followed by dress rehearsals on 17 and 18 May. This included the jury show on 17 May where the professional juries of each country watched and voted on the competing entries.

The Belgian performance featured the members of Hooverphonic dressed in black outfits and performing on stage together with a backing vocalist and a drummer. The group's lead singer Geike Arnaert was in the middle of the stage and the other performers were each on a platform around her. The stage was dark with strobes of white light and the LED screens displayed close-ups and shots of Arnaert's face. The Belgian performance was directed by Hans Pannecoucke. The backing vocalist that joined Hooverphonic during the performance was Monique Harcum, while the drummer was Arnout Hellofs.

At the end of the show, Belgium was announced as having finished in the top 10 and subsequently qualifying for the grand final. It was later revealed that Belgium placed ninth in the semi-final, receiving a total of 117 points: 47 points from the televoting and 70 points from the juries.

Final 
Shortly after the first semi-final, a winners' press conference was held for the ten qualifying countries. As part of this press conference, the qualifying artists took part in a draw to determine which half of the grand final they would subsequently participate in. This draw was done in the order the countries were announced during the semi-final. Belgium was drawn to compete in the first half. Following this draw, the shows' producers decided upon the running order of the final, as they had done for the semi-finals. Belgium was subsequently placed to perform in position 4, following the entry from Israel and before the entry from Russia.

Hooverphonic once again took part in dress rehearsals on 21 and 22 May before the final, including the jury final where the professional juries cast their final votes before the live show. The band performed a repeat of their semi-final performance during the final on 22 May. Belgium placed nineteenth in the final, scoring 74 points: 3 points from the televoting and 71 points from the juries.

Voting 
Voting during the three shows involved each country awarding two sets of points from 1-8, 10 and 12: one from their professional jury and the other from televoting. Each nation's jury consisted of five music industry professionals who are citizens of the country they represent, with a diversity in gender and age represented. The judges assess each entry based on the performances during the second Dress Rehearsal of each show, which takes place the night before each live show, against a set of criteria including: vocal capacity; the stage performance; the song's composition and originality; and the overall impression by the act. Jury members may only take part in panel once every three years, and are obliged to confirm that they are not connected to any of the participating acts in a way that would impact their ability to vote impartially. Jury members should also vote independently, with no discussion of their vote permitted with other jury members. The exact composition of the professional jury, and the results of each country's jury and televoting were released after the grand final; the individual results from each jury member were also released in an anonymised form.

Below is a breakdown of points awarded to Belgium and awarded by Belgium in the first semi-final and grand final of the contest, and the breakdown of the jury voting and televoting conducted during the two shows:

Points awarded to Belgium

Points awarded by Belgium

Detailed voting results 
The following members comprised the Belgian jury:
 Lien De Greef (Lady Linn)
 
 Yves Ruth
 Pommelien Thijs
 Katrien Verbeeck (Kate Ryan)

References 

2021
Countries in the Eurovision Song Contest 2021
Eurovision